Muhammad Hasan (born 1902, date of death unknown) was a Prince in the Afghanistani House of Barakzai.

Biography
Prince Hasan born in 1902 and was the third son of General HRH Sardar Muhammad 'Umar Khan and his fourth wife, Bibi Daulat.

Prince Hasan served as Aide-de-Camp to King Amānullāh Khān during the period 1926-1927 and as Court Chamberlain during the period 1927-1928. In October 1927, he married Princess Razia, a younger daughter of King Habibullah Khan. They had one son (Prince Abdullah Hasan, b. February 1929) and one daughter (Princess Halima Hasan, b 4 June 1939).

He entered into exile in Italy in 1929 as a result of the successful rebellion against the King led by Habibullāh Kalakāni. With his wife, he founded the Rome Mosque. He died in Rome, Italy.

Honours

References

1902 births
Year of death missing
Pashtun people
Recipients of the Grand Cross of the Order of Leopold II
Honorary Knights Grand Cross of the Royal Victorian Order
Grand Crosses of the Order of Polonia Restituta
Knights of the Order of Saints Maurice and Lazarus
Grand Officiers of the Légion d'honneur